G. Michael Brown is a former New Jersey gaming regulator who became a lawyer for the gaming industry, and was the chief executive officer of Foxwoods High Stakes Bingo & Casino.

References

Living people
Year of birth missing (living people)
Place of birth missing (living people)